The Pivdennyi Vokzal or Yuzhny Vokzal is a station on Kharkiv Metro's Kholodnohirsko–Zavodska Line. The station was opened on 23 August 1975. It is located beneath a square near Kharkiv's main railway station, Pivdennyy Vokzal, literally Southern Station, for which the metro station is named. From the station hall, two pedestrian tunnels lead directly to the control building of the railway station and to the post office and out-of-town ticket counters within the train station.

The station is lain deeply underground and is a pylon trivault, which is separated by arcades of tracks. The station itself was designed by V.A. Spivachuk, and engineered by Y.E. Kruk and Y.A. Korovkin. The floor has been finished off with grey and black flags of polished granite. The lighting comes from hidden niches under the curved ceilings.

In spite of its depth, the Pivdenniy Vokzal was moored by the open construction method. The local hydro-geological circumstances confronted the engineers with a particularly difficult task. Because of the type of clay in the ground, the earth around the station had to be frozen, a task which took five years to complete.

When the first section of the Kholodnohirsko-Zavodska line was opened, only four train wagons were used. Five train wagon appearing later. The stations on the line were built with room to expand from carrying four train wagons to five, all except the Pivdenniy Vokzal station. When  the station was enlarged, the entrance to the areas for the workers of the metro, which was previously located in the train tunnel had to be incorporated into the station.

External links
 Yuzhny Vokzal on Gortransport Kharkiv site

Kharkiv Metro stations